John W. "Fozzie" Miller is a retired United States Navy Vice Admiral who last served as Commander, U.S. Naval Forces Central Command/Commander, U.S. Fifth Fleet, based in Manama, Bahrain. Prior to assuming the duties of NAVCENT/C5F, Miller was special assistant to the Deputy Chief of Naval Operations for Operations, Plans, and Strategy (N3/N5) in Washington, D.C. He has also served as NAVCENT deputy commander.

Biography

Early life
He graduated from the Naval War College and received a master's degree in International Relations from Salve Regina University.

Military career
He was commissioned an Ensign upon graduating from the U.S. Naval Academy in 1979, and received his Naval Flight Officer designation in 1980, after which he reported to VF-101 for training in the F-14A Tomcat. His sea duty includes tours as a division officer in VF-31; maintenance officer at VF-84; and six command tours: VF-142; VF-101; USS Dubuque; USS Juneau; USS Constellation, as her final commanding officer; and USS John F. Kennedy. As a flag officer, Miller also commanded Carrier Strike Group 11.

Ashore, he has served as an instructor at VF-101; leadership section head at the Naval Academy; a White House Fellowship as special assistant to the NASA Administrator; and aviation commander assignment officer at the Bureau of Naval Personnel. Since being promoted to flag rank, Miller has had particular focus on the CENTCOM area of responsibility, serving as deputy commander of NAVCENT/Fifth Fleet; deputy director, Strategy, Plans, and Policy (J5); and as CENTCOM chief of staff. He has also commanded the US Navy Strike and Air Warfare Center.

Retirement and Later Work
Miller was named to the position of Deputy Chief of Naval Operations for Plans, Policy, and Operations (N3/N5) in March 2014. However, his planned successor was unable to assume the Commander Fifth Fleet/Naval Forces Central Command role due to being under investigation as part of the Fat Leonard scandal, one of several flag officers not involved in the scandal who had transfers and promotions delayed due to the investigations.

Miller retired from the Navy in 2015. Since retirement, he was worked with the Middle East Institute and the American Enterprise Institute.

Awards and decorations
Vice Admiral Miller has amassed over 3,500 flight hours and 1,000 arrested landings from six different carriers. His awards include:

See also

References 

Official Navy biography   This work is in the public domain.

Living people
Naval War College alumni
Salve Regina University alumni
United States Navy admirals
Date of birth missing (living people)
Recipients of the Legion of Merit
Year of birth missing (living people)